Peggy is a 1970 historical novel by Lois Duncan. It is a semi-fictionalized account of the life of Peggy Shippen, the second wife of General Benedict Arnold, a prominent figure in  Philadelphia after the American Revolutionary War.

See also
Peggy Shippen

References

External links
Peggy at Google Books

1970 American novels
Biographical novels
Historical novels
Novels by Lois Duncan
Novels set in Philadelphia
Little, Brown and Company books